Kim Si-eun (born October 29, 2000) is a South Korean actress and model. She is known for her lead roles in Crushes Reverse, Miss Independent Ji Eun 2, and Monchouchou Globalhouse. She is also known for her role in the hit drama Love Alarm as Yook-jo.

Filmography

Film

Television

Ambassadorship
 Honorary Ambassador for the 2019 Asia-Pacific Forest Conference

References

External links 
 
 
 

Living people
21st-century South Korean actresses
South Korean female models
South Korean television actresses
South Korean web series actresses
2000 births
South Korean film actresses